River Oaks is an unincorporated community in San Benito County, California, United States.

Climate
This region experiences warm (but not hot) and dry summers, with no average monthly temperatures above 71.6 °F.  According to the Köppen Climate Classification system, River Oaks has a warm-summer Mediterranean climate, abbreviated "Csb" on climate maps.

References

Unincorporated communities in California
Unincorporated communities in San Benito County, California